Vila de Prado is a Portuguese civil parish located in the Vila Verde municipality that is located in the Braga district. Its current president is Albano Bastos. 

The location used to be called Prado (Santa Maria) until 1991 when the village status was granted to it, making its name be Vila de Prado.

History

Period of Roman domination 
Due to its strategic location it constituted an important populational focus during Roman domination. Its clayey nature might have also contributed to such, as at the time, the ceramic industry was proliferating.

Tenth to sixteenth century 
Throughout the course of the tenth century Prado was dominated by Portuguese counts. During the afonsine inquiries of 1220, Prado contained 16 parishes. In 1260 D.Afonso III granted foral to it. Prior to the Prado parish was one called Santiago de Francelos that is referenced in documents from 1445 but that by 1528 had already been assimilated by Prado. In 1510 another fora would be granted to it, this time by D.Manuel.

Nineteenth to twentieth century 
Studies of the Maria da Fonte revolt allude to an outbreak of a rebellion in Vila de Prado on the 15th of April of 1846. It is thought that it was due to this revolt that on the 24th of October of 1855 the municipality of Prado was abolished together with the Penela, Vila Chã and Pico de Regalados municipalities. After this Prado became integrated into the new Vila Verde municipality with its parishes being distributed between the Vila Verde, Barcelos and Braga municipalities. By initiative of deputies Alberto Cerqueira de Oliveira and Amândio Santa Cruz Domingos Basto Oliveira, Prado regained its Vila status on the 20th of June of 1991.

Government

Points of Interest 

 Capela de São Tiago de Francelos: Chapel located in Francelos.
 Casa da Botica: Building built in 1720 to house the Paulo Silva family.                                
 Ponte de Prado: Bridge that crosses the Cávado River.
 Capela de Nossa Senhora do Bom Sucesso: Chapel located in the civil parish's historic center.

References

Freguesias of Vila Verde